Simon Erlandsson (born September 4, 1994) is a Swedish professional ice hockey defenceman. He is currently playing with Skedvi/Säter of the Swedish Division 2 (Div.2).

Erlandsson made his Swedish Hockey League debut playing with Leksands IF during the 2013–14 SHL season.

References

External links

1994 births
Living people
Bofors IK players
Leksands IF players
Swedish ice hockey defencemen
People from Falun
Sportspeople from Dalarna County